Wirtz is an unincorporated community in Franklin County, Virginia, United States. Wirtz has a post office with ZIP code 24184, which opened on April 20, 1893.

The Gwin Dudley Home Site was listed on the National Register of Historic Places in 2008.

References

Unincorporated communities in Franklin County, Virginia
Unincorporated communities in Virginia